Veli Johannes Paavo Bartholomeus Räsänen (24 August 1888 – 16 July 1953) was a Finnish lichenologist.

Early life and education

Veli Räsänen was born on 24 August 1888 in Simo, Finland. Räsänen's brother was the linguist Martti Räsänen. His parents were primary school teachers Antti Räsänen, and Kaisa Sofia Vuolevi. He took his matriculation examination in 1909 in Oulu, and graduated with a Bachelor of Arts in 1913, a master's degree in 1914 and a licentiate and doctorate in 1927 from the University of Helsinki. Räsänen worked at the Lapua agricultural lyceum for teachers from 1918 to 1921 teaching natural sciences and animal husbandry. He was an instructor in the Agricultural School, as a lecturer from 1921 to 1940. Räsänen became a college lecturer from 1940 to 1953 in Kuopio. He published literature on lichens, including the book  ("Finnish Lichens") (1951).

Räsänen apprenticed with Edvard Vainio at the University of Turku, and eagerly collected lichens during his student years. His first publications were about beard lichens and other interesting lichen finds. His first major dissertation, published in 1926, concerned the lichen flora in North Ostrobothnia. His dissertation for the licentiate degree was titled  ("About lichen locations and lichen vegetation in western northern Finland"). In a study of lichens in the Pechenga area, he catalogued more than 520 taxa. He also described several species of lichenicolous fungi.

Räsänen was a devoted researcher and worked quickly. He was happy to be sent lichen collections, e.g. from the University of Helsinki Botanical Garden. He also received and completed collections from abroad, defining numerous lichen taxa previously unknown to science. In Kuopio, he became one of the central personalities of the natural history association.

Räsänen made extensive collections of lichens and used a large part of this material for the compilation of lichen exsiccata – dried herbarium specimens. Thus, under his auspices, the exsiccata work , previously published by Johan Petter Norrlin and William Nylander, and later Vainio, was continued by the Botanical Museum in Helsinki. Räsänen compiled 20 fascicles on a total of 1,000 issues during the years 1935–1946. In Kuopio he compiled the exsiccata "", 30 fascicles during the years 1946–1952, comprising a total of 750 issues (25 issues in each fascicle, in the Helsinki exsiccata 50 numbers per fascicle).

Räsänen tried to arouse interest in studying and collecting lichens among younger people. In this respect, mention should be made of his novice book  ("Finnish lichens") (1951), comprising 158 pages and 16 paintings.

Räsänen died on 16 July 1953 in Simo.

Eponymy
Several lichen species have been named in honour of Veli Räsänen. These include: Caloplaca raesaenenii ; Lecanora raesaenenii ; Pertusaria raesaenenii ; Usnea raesaenenii ; and Verrucaria raesaenenii . The genera Raesaenenia  and Raesaeneniana  are also named after him.

Selected publications

See also
 :Category:Taxa named by Veli Räsänen

References

1888 births
1953 deaths
20th-century Finnish botanists
Finnish lichenologists
Finnish taxonomists
University of Helsinki alumni
People from Simo, Finland